Li Yanan may refer to:
 Leanne Li, Chinese-born Canadian actress and television host
 Li Yanan (judoka)